HMS Thunderer was a 74-gun third rate ship of the line of the Royal Navy, launched on 19 March 1760 at Woolwich. She  earned a battle honour in a single-ship action off Cadiz with the French ship Achille (64 guns) in 1761, during the Seven Years' War.

She foundered in the Great Hurricane of 1780 in the West Indies, reportedly 90 miles east of Jamaica on the Formigas Banks with the loss of all 617 on board. Among the lost sailors were the Captain, Robert Boyle-Walsingham (1736–1780), and Midshipman Nathaniel Cook (1764–1780), the second child of Captain James Cook.

Two cannons attributed to the ship are displayed at a rum cake factory on Grand Cayman Island. A plaque states that they were recovered in 1984 by the research vessel Beacon.

Notes

External links

References

Ships of the line of the Royal Navy
Hercules-class ships of the line
Ships built in Woolwich
1760 ships
Shipwrecks in the Caribbean Sea
Maritime incidents in 1780